The following are the winners of the 7th annual (1980) Origins Award, presented at Origins 1981:

Charles Roberts Awards

The H.G. Wells Awards

External links
 1980 Origins Awards Winners

1980 awards
1980 awards in the United States
Origins Award winners